Killer Flamingos is an American Pop rock band from Dearborn, Michigan, signed to Chim Cham Records. They released their debut album Sick Society in 2002.

Band members
Alyssa Simmons- Lead Vocals
Darren Drake - keyboards
Todd Best - Lead guitar
David Gondoly - Bass guitar
Tim Webber - Drums

External links 
Killer Flamingos official website

References 

American pop rock music groups